The Goddess is a 1958 American drama film directed by John Cromwell and starring Kim Stanley and Lloyd Bridges. From a screenplay by Paddy Chayefsky, the film is an in-depth character study of the life of a troubled and lonely girl who becomes a movie star adored by millions, but is miserable in her private life. The movie was nominated for an Academy Award for Best Original Screenplay.

Plot
Emily Ann Faulkner is born into poverty in The South, has no father, no friends, and is unloved by her indifferent mother Laureen, who does not want to be tied down by a child. As a teenager, Emily is socially ostracized by the local townspeople, except for the boys who are attracted to her good looks and sexual availability. Emily lets them have sex with her in order to have some brief respite from her loneliness; the rest of the time, she retreats into Hollywood fantasies. During WWII, she meets and marries world-weary G.I. John Tower, who also suffers from his dysfunctional upbringing as the son of a well-known movie actor. Unable to cope with a rocky marriage and unwanted pregnancy, Emily soon escapes to Hollywood, leaving her baby daughter in John's care.

In Hollywood, Emily soon marries Dutch Seymour, a former champion boxer turned Hollywood socialite. She initially enjoys the attention and social status she gets as Dutch's wife, but rejects his idea that they move to St. Louis so he could join his family's business. Anxious to further her career, Emily poses for risque magazine photos and has casting couch affairs, ending her marriage to Dutch. Emily is soon transformed into the glamorous superstar sex goddess, Rita Shawn. Despite her celebrity and wealth, she is still insecure and fears being alone, seeking comfort in drinking and promiscuity.

Rita finally has a nervous breakdown requiring hospitalization, which causes her elderly mother Laureen to finally come to Hollywood for a visit. Rita is thrilled to see her mother and clings to her, trying to impress her. However, Laureen has turned from her past immorality to religious fervor, is unimpressed by Rita's money and success, and mainly seeks to convert her daughter. Rita has very few friends, and the visiting couple she introduces to her mother as her "dearest and oldest friends" privately tell Laureen that they barely know Rita and only met her a short time ago, adding that Rita should see a psychiatrist.

Rita wants her mother to stay with her permanently, but Laureen insists on returning home to her simple life of attending church, caring for her sick brother, and helping her sister-in-law run the family store. As her mother is leaving, Rita becomes enraged and screams from the doorway that she hates her and wishes her dead. When her mother later dies, Rita has a drunken public breakdown at her grave. The self-destructive Rita now lives under the constant supervision of a stern secretary/ nurse Harding, who has become Rita's mother figure. John Tower tries to reconcile with Rita/ Emily for the sake of their young daughter, whom John has learned to love, thus breaking the cycle of family dysfunction. But Rita is too psychologically damaged.

Cast

 Kim Stanley as Emily Ann Faulkner/Rita Shawn
 Lloyd Bridges as Dutch Seymour
 Steven Hill as John Tower 
 Betty Lou Holland as Mrs. Laureen Faulkner
 Burt Brinckerhoff as The Boy
 Bert Freed as Lester Brackman
 Gerald Hiken as George 
 Elizabeth Wilson as Harding 
 Joan Copeland as Alice Marie
 Joyce Van Patten as Hillary
 Joanne Linville as Joanna
 Donald Mckee as R.M. Lucas
 John Lawrence as Soldier
 Curt Conway as The Writer
 Fred Herrick as The Elder
 Patty Duke as Emily Ann Faulkner, age 8
 Linda Soma as Bridesmaid 
 Kris Flanagan as Himself 
 Geroge Petrarca as The Minister
 Roy Shuman as Soldier 
 Gail Haworth as Emily's Daughter

Production
The story is said to be based loosely on Marilyn Monroe. According to an article published by Turner Classic Movies, 
"Some critics have conjectured that The Goddess was based on the career of Ava Gardner, but most think its primary model was Marilyn Monroe, who studied at the Actors Studio at the same time Stanley did."

The Goddess was filmed, in part, in Ellicott City, Maryland, which serves as childhood home of Emily Ann and provides the backdrop for the opening and closing scenes. The interior scenes were filmed at the Gold Medal Studios, the Bronx, New York; in addition to Maryland, location filming was also done in Hollywood, at the Beverly Hills Hotel in Beverly Hills and at the Fox Village Theater, Westwood, California. Frank Thompson designed the costumes for the film.

Reception
Bosley Crowther of The New York Times called The Goddess "a shattering, but truly potent, film, in which a lot of characters are groping for the fulfillment they cannot seem to find". Crowther argued that scriptwriter Chayefsky "has studied his subject thoughtfully, for the meshing of human contacts and emotional relations is clear and sound. Furthermore, he has conveyed them in finely written scenes and dialogue." In the book The Immortal Marilyn, scholars De John Vito and Frank Tropea praised Chayefsky's writing as "masterful", and wrote that Stanley "pulled out all the stops, perfectly hitting every single note of Chayefsky's complex, lyrical arias". Conversely, in an article for TCM, authors Mikita Brottman and David Sterritt criticize the work as having "a stilted pace, underwritten minor characters, and a mood that's much too solemn".

Adaptation
In 2013, director John Mossman adapted the screenplay for a stage production at Chicago's The Artistic Home, receiving a Jeff Award for New Adaptation and marking the first screen-to-stage adaptation of a Chayefsky screenplay.

References

External links

 
 The Artistic Home

1958 films
1958 drama films
Films directed by John Cromwell
Films about actors
Films à clef
Films with screenplays by Paddy Chayefsky
Films shot in Maryland
American drama films
1950s English-language films
1950s American films